Hyde End is a small hamlet, in the civil parish of Great Missenden. it is located between the hamlets of Hyde Heath and South Heath along the B485 road between Chesham and Great Missenden, in the Chiltern Hills,  Buckinghamshire. It comprises a small number of dwellings, including a row of early 1900s cottages, a row of 1930s cottages and larger houses and farm properties.

Hamlets in Buckinghamshire